The Digilux 3 is a digital single-lens reflex camera introduced by Leica on 14 September 2006. The Digilux 3 and the Panasonic Lumix DMC-L1 are similar specification cameras, using the Four Thirds standard lens mount and featuring a 7.5 Megapixels live view N-MOS sensor, but the Digilux 3 has modified firmware including DNG output. Both the Panasonic and Digilux 3 cameras come standard with the same interchangeable Leica Elmarit 14–50 mm f/2.8–3.5 optically image-stabilized zoom lens. The Leica D system includes also the Leica Summilux 25 mm f/1.4 lens.

The two cameras share several unique features among dSLRs.  One is the presence of film-camera type controls for optional control of both aperture and shutter speed. Reviews have noted the intuitive "feel" of the cameras.

Another is the built-in dual-position flash.  With an initial actuation of the flash button, the flash pops up to a bounce-flash position, giving a more diffuse flash that is preferred by some photographers, especially for portrait photos.  A second actuation of the button raises the flash to a forward-facing position for direct flash. 

Some of the build features are inherited from the Olympus E-330, such as the eyepiece. Spare parts, such as the EP-7 eyecup from Olympus, can be used on the Digilux 3.

The camera also includes a comprehensive software package Adobe® Photoshop® Elements® 4.0 and Quicktime movie player. Only 13,300 of these cameras were made, making it somewhat rare.  (W x H x D without lens) - 145.8 x 86.9 x 80 mm Weight (camera body) - approx. 530 g. Designed by Achim Heine, Berlin.(Leica), Electronics by Matsushita/Olympus

See also
Leica Digilux 1
Leica Digilux 2
Panasonic
Lumix

References

External links

Leica Digilux 3 Technical Data at leica-camera.us (PDF format)

Digilux 3
Four Thirds System